Abdeen Mosque is the main mosque in the Wadi al-Joz neighborhood in East Jerusalem, about  away from Al-Aqsa Mosque and the Old City walls. It was built by brothers Abdel Muhsin and Omar Abdeen in 1939.

References

1939 establishments in Mandatory Palestine
Mosques in Jerusalem
Mosques completed in 1939